Jonathan Russell (born 1979) is an American composer of classical music, clarinetist, and bass clarinetist. Russell was the founder of the Switchboard Music Festival, which will hold its 10th anniversary in the summer of 2018. His primary teachers have included Paul Lansky, Barbara White, Steve Mackey, Elinor Armer, and Eric Ewazen.

Career

Composer 
Russell has been commissioned by, worked with, and written for ensembles including the San Francisco Symphony, Prism Quartet, Symphony Number One, Empyrian Ensemble, Wild Rumpus, Woodstock Chamber Orchestra, and the JACK Quartet.

The Imani Winds has a long-term relationship with Mr. Russell through the wind quintets Legacy Commissioning Project, which has led to three large scale arrangements of orchestral works for woodwind quintet.

Clarinet and bass clarinet

Soloist 
A frequent composer for various clarinets, Russell frequently solos as a bass clarinetist, performing his own and other works. Among his own works, he premiered his Sonata for Bass Clarinet and Piano with pianist Kate Campbell which Campbell herself commissioned. Mr. Russell's performance of Debussy's Premiere Rhapsody was noted for giving, “increasing energy, leading to a smashingly tangy conclusion from a lurking opening. Russell is a real virtuoso with true command over his instrument’s range of expression…”

Sqwonk 
Along with his partner Jeff Anderle, the bass clarinet duo Sqwonk performed in the San Francisco area. The ensemble has self-released several albums of original music for bass clarinet duo as well as works for small ensemble.

Edmund Welles 

Sqwonk members Anderle and Russell join with Cornelius Boots and Aaron Novik to form quartet Edmund Welles: The Bass Clarinet Quartet which themselves also have their own discography.

List of works

Original works 
 ...and the Beast
 ...in the fir trees: fireflies
 Bass Clarinet Concerto
 Bass Clarinet Double Concerto
 Claremont Suite
 Groove: for Bass Clarinet Solo
 Eleven
 KlezDuo (2005)
 Lament and Frippery
 Light Cathedral
 Octet
 O Cool is the Valley Now
 Rain Has Fallen
 Repetitive Stress
 Sonata for Bass Clarinet and Piano
 String Quartet
 Supra
 Technobabble
 Twelve Bean Groove Machine

Arrangements 
 Rimsky Korsakov: Scheherazade
 Holst: The Planets
 Stravinsky: The Rite of Spring

Discography

References

External links

1979 births
Living people
21st-century American composers
Harvard University alumni
American jazz clarinetists
Edmund Welles members